Jiyalal Mandal (3 March 1915 – 9 February 1973) was an Indian politician and freedom fighter. He was elected to the Lok Sabha, lower house of the Parliament of India from Khagaria , Bihar as member of the Indian National Congress.

References

External links
Official biographical sketch in Parliament of India website

1915 births
India MPs 1957–1962
India MPs 1962–1967
Lok Sabha members from Bihar
1973 deaths
Indian Hindus
Bihari politicians
Dalit politicians
Indian National Congress politicians from Bihar